David Leland is a British film director and screenwriter.

David Leland may also refer to:

David J. Leland (born 1953), American lawyer and politician from Ohio
David Leland (actor) (1932–1948), American actor